McClellan Butte is a prominent peak in the Cascade Range in King County, Washington 11 miles east of North Bend.  The McClellan Butte hiking trail is a difficult trail known as an alternative to Mount Si's crowded trail.

Climate

McClellan Butte is located in the marine west coast climate zone of western North America. Most weather fronts originate in the Pacific Ocean, and travel northeast toward the Cascade Mountains. As fronts approach, they are forced upward by the peaks of the Cascade Range, causing them to drop their moisture in the form of rain or snowfall onto the Cascades (Orographic lift). As a result, the west side of the Cascades experiences high precipitation, especially during the winter months in the form of snowfall. During winter months, weather is usually cloudy, but, due to high pressure systems over the Pacific Ocean that intensify during summer months, there is often little or no cloud cover during the summer. Precipitation runoff from McClellan Butte drains into the Snoqualmie River.

See also
 Mount Washington (Cascades)
 Mount Kent

References

External links
 

Mountains of King County, Washington
Mountains of Washington (state)